Cresco is an unincorporated community in Thorncreek Township, Whitley County, in the U.S. state of Indiana.

History

A post office was established at Cresco in 1888, and remained in operation until it was discontinued in 1904. The name of the community is derived from the Latin term Cresco, meaning "I grow".

Geography

References

Unincorporated communities in Whitley County, Indiana
Unincorporated communities in Indiana